For 1980 in television, see:

1980 in American television
1980 in Australian television
1980 in Austrian television
1980 in Belgian television
1980 in Brazilian television
1980 in British television
1980 in Canadian television
1980 in Chinese television
1980 in Croatian television
1980 in Danish television
1980 in Dutch television
1980 in Estonian television
1980 in French television
1980 in German television
1980 in Greek television
1980 in Irish television
1980 in Japanese television
1980 in New Zealand television
1980 in Philippine television
1980 in Scottish television
1980 in Singapore television
1980 in South African television
1980 in South Korean television
1980 in Thai television